Jackson Mills is an unincorporated community located within Jackson Township, in Ocean County, New Jersey, United States. Jackson Mills is located near exit 22 on Interstate 195. It is also located nearby County Route 526 (County Line Road and Commodore Boulevard) and Jackson Mills Lake. The site was originally home to a sawmill owned by William Jackson (after whom the township may have been named). Today surrounding the lake are some houses and townhomes, small businesses, and the Jackson Township Veterans Memorial Garden, though this area of the township is more rural than other more suburbanized portions of it due to the higher density of forest.

References

External links

Jackson Mills Fire Company

Jackson Township, New Jersey
Unincorporated communities in Ocean County, New Jersey
Unincorporated communities in New Jersey